The Cannone da 75/27 A.V. was an anti-aircraft gun developed in Italy during the First World War that also saw service during the Second World War.

History 
The 75/27 A.V. (Anti Velivolo, Anti-Aircraft) cannon was privately developed by Ansaldo to supply an anti-aircraft gun to the Regia Esercito.

Technical 
The 75/27 A.V. used the barrel and hydro-spring recoil mechanism from the Cannone da 75/27 modello 06 a license-built version of the Krupp Kanone M 1906 field gun to speed up production and it used the same Fixed QF 75 x 185mm R ammunition. The barrel consisted of a rifled liner with 28 left-handed grooves, and an external jacket, it was  L/27 long and weighed  including the semi-automatic horizontal sliding-wedge breech.  The breech closed automatically when a projectile was fed into the chamber and after firing the shell casing was ejected and the breech was held open for the next round.

Variants 
 The 75/27 A.V. - was mounted on a static center pivot mount with -5° to + 80° of elevation and 360° of traverse.  The 75/27 A.V. was used during the First World War for the defense of metropolitan areas by the Regia Esercito.  During the Second World War it was assigned to coastal defense, anti-aircraft, and second line units.
 The Autocannone da 75/27 C.K. - was a self-propelled anti-aircraft gun with a new pedestal mount and new recoil mechanism that was mounted on the chassis of a Lancia 1Z truck.  In 1915 these formed the basis of Italy's first truck-mounted artillery.  Eventually, twenty-seven batteries of five guns were formed during World War I.

Notes

References 
 Filippo Cappellano, Le artiglierie del Regio Esercito nella Seconda Guerra Mondiale, Storia Militare, 1998.
 Chamberlain, Peter & Gander, Terry. Light and Medium Field Artillery. New York: Arco, 1975.
 Ralph A Riccio, Italian truck-mounted artillery in action Carrollton, TX: Squadron Signal, 2010.

See also 
 Cannone da 75/27 Mod. 1906
 Cannone 75/27 C.K.

External Links 
 sul sito dell'associazione "Custodia del Grifo Arciere"
 su regioesercito.it

Gio. Ansaldo & C. artillery
World War I artillery of Italy
World War II artillery of Italy
Military equipment of World War I
Military equipment of World War II
Artillery of Italy